Wall of Voodoo (EP) is the debut EP by American rock band Wall of Voodoo, released in 1980 by Index Records. It contains one of Wall of Voodoo's best-known songs, a cover of Johnny Cash's "Ring of Fire". The second half of the song features a guitar solo that quotes the theme to the 1966 film Our Man Flint.

In 1991, Restless Records issued the EP on CD for the first time, with the addition of live bonus tracks, under the title The Index Masters.

Track listing
Side one
 "Longarm" – 3:44
 "The Passenger" – 4:07
Side two
 "Can't Make Love" – 3:47
 "Struggle" - 2:14
 "Ring of Fire" – 4:59
 "Granma's House" - 0:55

References

Wall of Voodoo albums
1980 debut EPs